Ilyobates is a genus of beetles belonging to the family Staphylinidae.

Species:
 Ilyobates bennetti Donisthorpe, 1914 
 Ilyobates haroldi Ihssen, 1934 	 
 Ilyobates mech (Baudi, 1848) 	 
 Ilyobates merkli Eppelsheim, 1883 	 
 Ilyobates mirabilis Assing, 1999 	 
 Ilyobates nigricollis (Paykull, 1800) 	 
 Ilyobates propinquus (Aubé, 1850)

References

Staphylinidae
Staphylinidae genera